Antonio Vivaldi wrote a set of sonatas, Op. 5, in 1716.

Sonata No. 1 in F Major, RV 18
Preludio
Corrente
Sarabanda
Giga
Sonata No. 2 in A Major, RV 30
Preludio
Corrente
Gavotta
Sonata No. 3 in B Flat Major, RV 33
Preludio
Alllemanda
Corrente
Gavotta
Sonata No. 4 in B minor, RV 35
Preludio
Allemanda
Corrente
Sonata No. 5 for 2 violins and basso continuo in B Flat Major, RV 76
Preludio
Allemanda
Corrente
Sonata No. 6 for 2 violins and basso continuo in G minor, RV 72
Preludio
Allemanda
Air
Minuetto

Compositions by Antonio Vivaldi
1716 compositions